Saint-Rémy (Languedocien: Sent Remèsi) is a commune in the Aveyron department in southern France.

Population

See also
Communes of the Aveyron department

References

Communes of Aveyron
Aveyron communes articles needing translation from French Wikipedia